Belo Polje is a Serbian place name, meaning "white field". It may refer to:

Kosovo
 , a village in Peć, Kosovo

Serbia
 Belo Polje (Surdulica), an industrial settlement on the approach to Surdulic and now part of the town of Surdulica
 Belo Polje (Obrenovac), a village in municipality of Obrenovac
 Belo Polje (Brus), a village in municipality of Brus
 Belo Polje (Gornji Milanovac), a village in municipality of Gornji Milanovac
 Belo Polje (Kuršumlija), a village in municipality of Kuršumlija
 Belo Polje (Raška), a village in municipality of Raška

See also
 Bijelo Polje, a town and municipality in northern Montenegro
 Belo Pole (disambiguation)

Serbo-Croatian place names